Dick Tressel (born. c. 1948) is a former American football coach and college athletics administrator. He served as the head football coach at Hamline University  in Saint Paul, Minnesota, from 1978 to 2000, compiling a record of 124–102–2. Tressel was also the athletic director at Hamline from 1979 to 2000. He then moved on to Ohio State University where he worked as an assistant football coach under his brother, Jim Tressel, from 2001 to 2010. Both brothers played college football for their father, Lee Tressel, at Baldwin Wallace University.

Tressel first head coaching position was at Gibsonburg High School in Gibsonburg, Ohio, where he coached future Ohio State All-American Ted Smith.

Head coaching record

References

Year of birth missing (living people)
1940s births
Living people
American football defensive backs
Baseball second basemen
Baldwin Wallace Yellow Jackets baseball players
Baldwin Wallace Yellow Jackets football players
Florida State Seminoles football coaches
Hamline Pipers athletic directors
Hamline Pipers football coaches
Ohio State Buckeyes football coaches
Wayne State Warriors football coaches
High school football coaches in Ohio
People from Berea, Ohio
Coaches of American football from Ohio
Players of American football from Columbus, Ohio
Baseball players from Columbus, Ohio